State Road 320 (NM 320), also known as Thorpe Road, is a  two–lane state highway in the Mesilla Valley in Doña Ana County, New Mexico, United States, that connects New Mexico State Road 185 (NM 185) with the end of state maintenance in Doña Ana, just northeast of its interchange with Interstate 25/U.S. Route 85 (I-25/US 85).

Route description
(NM 185 heads north–northwesterly along the Rio Grande toward Radium Springs and Hatch. NM 185 heads southerly toward Las Cruces and Anthony.) From its western terminus, NM 320 heads northeast for about  before connecting with the north end of Redfox Road (which immediately enters a small gated community), followed by the north end of Strange Road (County Road 37) and then the north end of Marigold Street. Immediately after the jog, NM 320 connects with the south end of Giron Road (a dirt road), promptly crosses three sets of tracks for the BNSF Railway, and crosses Dona Ana Road (County Road 28).

Just after entering Doña Ana, NM 320 connects with the north end of Dusty Lane and then crosses Abeyta Street as the highway turns to head east. NM 320 then crosses Ledesma Drive (passing just north of the post office for the community, which is signed as "Dona Ana") and then connects with south end of Venegas Drive and north end of Joe Gutierrez Street. Directly thereafter, NM 320 turns to head northeast again as it connects with the north end of El Camino Real Road and passes between two gas stations (the southern of which also serves as the local stop for Greyhound Lines intercity bus service.) Immediately thereafter, NM 320 reaches a diamond interchange with I-25/US 85 (Exit 9) on the southeastern corner of the limits of Doña Ana. (I-25/US 85 heads northwest toward Radium Springs and Hatch. I-25/US 85 heads southeast toward Las Cruces, Interstate 10/U.S. Route 180, Anthony, and El Paso, Texas.) (Thorpe Road continues northeast (very briefly as County Road 36) before crossing Del Ray Boulevard and turning south–southeast dead end in an Industrial park.)

Traffic

The New Mexico Department of Transportation (NMDOT) collects data for the State Roads and Local Federal-Aid roads. Traffic is measured in both directions and reported as Annual Average Daily Traffic (AADT). , along is busiest section (at the I-25/US 85 interchage) NM 320 had an AADT of 6,369, a decrease just under 20 percent from the previous year. Also in 2015, the lowest AADT section of NM 320 was between Dona Ana Road and the interstate interchange, with an AADT of 4,773. Interestingly, the section the west end (between the western terminus and Dona Ana Road had a somewhat higher AADT of 5,575.

History

Major intersections

See also

 List of state roads in New Mexico

Notes

References

External links

320
Transportation in Doña Ana County, New Mexico